On camera...Patti Page...favorites from TV was a 1959 Patti Page LP, issued by Mercury Records as catalog number SR-60025.

It featured the most requested songs from viewers of her weekly TV show, and was with Jack Rael & His Orchestra. It was re-released on CD in 2005.

Track listing

References

Mercury Records albums